Julesburg is a village in Mopani District Municipality in the Limpopo province of South Africa. Julesburg is a rural area outside Tzaneen, which falls under Greater Tzaneen Municipality (GTM) ward 26, Julesburg is about 50 km from Tzaneen and about 12.5 km from Maake plaza. It has 7 official villages namely Rhulani (capital), Hovheni, Nsolani, Nyanyukani, Bordex (Bodweni) divided into two (Bodweni) yaka Regison Mbangwa Mohlaba (King Muhlaba) and Bodweni yaka Brown Mohlaba (braweni), Hweji. The areas nearer to Julesburg are Mogapeng, Tours, Ofcolaco, Callies and Burgersdorp.

Julesburg has a few notable alumni namely Tito Mboweni, Stet Mushwana, O.J Mushwana (speaker of the Mopani District), Neil Shikwambana (spokesperson Mopani District) and dr Garish Mohlaba, to name a few. The most famous hangouts are Julesburg sports field, Mckays Tavern, African Jazz Tavern and Sevengwana bar.,Borila Lounge, Vadanile Tavern  lounge. Schools are Dumela High School, Allegraine Primary School, Rhulani Primary School, Mageza Secondary School, Bordeax Primary School, Hovheni Primary School, and lastly Phyuphyani Secondary School. Julesburg has one clinic namely Julesburg Healthcare Centre.

Julesburg has many churches, to name a few, the famous AFM (Azuza Faith Mission) in Bordeax, ZCC, Imvano Getsemane of God and In Zion of Christ. There are two soccer clubs playing in the SAB league namely Julesburg Young Killers and Julesburg Arsenal.

References

Populated places in the Greater Tzaneen Local Municipality